Pseudotetracha whelani is a species of tiger beetle in the subfamily Cicindelinae that was described by Sumlin in 1992, and is endemic to Australia.

References

Beetles described in 1992
Endemic fauna of Australia
Beetles of Australia